|}

The Empress Stakes is a Listed flat horse race in Great Britain open to two-year-old fillies. It is run on the July Course at Newmarket over a distance of 6 furlongs (1,207 metres), and it is scheduled to take place each year in late June or early July.

During the 1980s the race was known as the Ewar Stud Farm Stakes.

Winners since 1988

See also 
 Horse racing in Great Britain
 List of British flat horse races

References
 Paris-Turf:
, 
Racing Post:

Flat races in Great Britain
Flat horse races for two-year-old fillies
Newmarket Racecourse